Rudong railway station 
() is a railway station in Rudong County, Nantong, Jiangsu, China. It is the terminus for passenger services on the Hai'an–Yangkou Port railway. It was opened on 16 January 2014.

References

Railway stations in Jiangsu
Railway stations in China opened in 2014